Edward Charles Pellagrini (March 13, 1918 – October 11, 2006) was an American infielder in Major League Baseball from – and from – for the Boston Red Sox, St. Louis Browns, Philadelphia Phillies, Cincinnati Reds, and Pittsburgh Pirates. He went on to become a longtime coach at Boston College.

Early baseball years
Born in Boston, Massachusetts, Pellagrini began his professional baseball career in 1938 and worked his way up through the minor leagues before being acquired by the Red Sox in September 1941, but spent 1942–1945 in the United States Navy, serving in the Pacific Theater of Operations, during World War II. On April 22, 1946 he hit a home run in his first Major League at bat with the Red Sox, helping the team to a 5-4 win over the Washington Senators, but he played in only 22 games that year and did not appear in the World Series; it would remain his only pennant-winning team.

Traded to St. Louis
Traded to the Browns after the 1947 season in the deal which brought Vern Stephens to Boston, he enjoyed his most consistent play in St. Louis, appearing in 184 games over two years and batting .238 in both campaigns. He returned to the minor leagues in 1950, and spent the final four years of his career with three National League teams, peaking with a 1953 season in which he hit .253 for the Pirates.

Statistics
He ended his career with a .226 batting average, 20 home runs, 321 hits, 167 runs, 133 runs batted in and 13 stolen bases in 563 games. Primarily a shortstop, he also saw significant playing time at second and third base.

Coach
Pellagrini went on to become the baseball coach at Boston College from 1958 to 1990 (although he missed the 1969 season due to illness), compiling a record of 359-345-6.

In 1960, his Eagles defeated Connecticut and Holy Cross in the regional tournament to advance to the CWS, where they beat Northern Colorado before losing to USC and Oklahoma State. In 1961, BC beat Springfield and took two games out of three against Connecticut in the regionals, again moving on to the CWS; they beat Western Michigan and Duke, but lost twice to eventual champion USC and fell one game short of the championship contest.

The 1962 tournament saw BC eliminated with regional losses to Vermont and Bridgeport, and they were again eliminated in 1966 with a regional loss to Northeastern after beating UMass. But he took his team back to the College World Series in 1967, taking two games out of three against both Dartmouth and UMass in the regionals. An opening-round CWS win against Rider was followed by losses to eventual champion Arizona State and Houston, the latter a 3-2 decision in 13 innings, ending the Eagles' play. As of 2006, Boston College has not returned to the CWS. In a ceremony on May 3, BC's baseball field was formally rededicated as Eddie Pellagrini Diamond at John Shea Field.

Pellagrini died at age 88 in Weymouth, Massachusetts.

See also
 Boston Red Sox all-time roster
 List of Major League Baseball players with a home run in their first major league at bat

References

External links

1918 births
2006 deaths
American people of Italian descent
Baltimore Orioles (IL) players
Baseball players from Boston
Boston College Eagles baseball coaches
Boston Red Sox players
Canton Terriers players
Cincinnati Reds players
Danville Leafs players
Louisville Colonels (minor league) players
Major League Baseball infielders
Philadelphia Phillies players
Pittsburgh Pirates players
Rocky Mount Red Sox players
St. Louis Browns players
San Diego Padres (minor league) players
Scranton Red Sox players
Burials at Massachusetts National Cemetery